Mouhamadou Habib Habibou (born 16 April 1987) is a Central African professional footballer who plays as a striker.

Club career

Early career
Habibou started his career with Ligue 1 club Paris Saint Germain progressing through the youth setup. After failing to break into the first team he moved to Belgian club R. Charleroi S.C. During his spell at Charleroi he joined Tubize on loan in 2007 scoring 10 goals in just 13 appearances, his form led to him earning a loan move to Romanian side Steaua București in 2008.

Zulte Waregem
In 2010, Habibou joined fellow Belgian side S.V. Zulte Waregem from Charleroi. he was given the squad number 7 shirt. In 2011, Habibou joined English side Brighton & Hove Albion on trial, In December 2011 he also had a trial spell at West Ham United, however he stayed at Zulte Waregem.

After scoring six goals in 13 games in the first half of the 2012–13 season, Habibou interested Premier League side Queens Park Rangers and joined them on trial, also training with Leeds United. After QPR signed French international striker Loïc Rémy the move for Habibou was put on the backburner as he edged closer to a move. With Leeds striker Luciano Becchio handing in a transfer request, Habibou was lined up as a replacement for Becchio in the January window.

Leeds United
On 31 January 2013, transfer deadline day, Habibou completed his move to Leeds United on a six-month loan with the option to make the move permanent. Habibou made his debut as a second-half substitute in Leeds' 1–0 defeat against Cardiff City on 2 February. Habibou's only start came in Leeds' Yorkshire Derby against Huddersfield Town.

On 3 May, Leeds announced that they would not be making Habibou's loan deal permanent.

Later career
On 1 September 2014, transfer deadline day, Habibou joined Rennes on a three-year deal. After 26 appearances and 3 goals in his first season with Rennes, Habibou departed in January 2016 to join Süper Lig team Gaziantepspor on loan. He played nine times but failed to score for the Gaziantep-based club before returning to Rennes. A year later, in January 2017, Habibou joined Ligue 2 side Lens on a two-year contract.

International career
Habibou was called up to the Central African Republic for 2013 Africa Cup of Nations qualifier against Burkina Faso on 14 October 2012. He made his debut in an AFCON qualifying 4–1 loss to DR Congo national football team on 4 September 2016.

Career statistics

Club
.

International
.

International goals
Scores and results list Central African Republic's goal tally first.

Trivia
In 2010, during a Zulte Waregem game against Lokeren, Habibou grabbed and threw a duck over advertising hoardings because it had wandered onto the field.

References

External links
 
 

1987 births
Living people
People from Haute-Kotto
Association football forwards
Central African Republic footballers
Central African Republic Muslims
Central African Republic international footballers
French footballers
Liga I players
Belgian Pro League players
English Football League players
Ligue 1 players
Süper Lig players
Ligue 2 players
Qatar Stars League players
Israeli Premier League players
R. Charleroi S.C. players
A.F.C. Tubize players
FC Steaua București players
S.V. Zulte Waregem players
K.A.A. Gent players
Leeds United F.C. players
Stade Rennais F.C. players
Gaziantepspor footballers
RC Lens players
Qatar SC players
Maccabi Petah Tikva F.C. players
K.S.C. Lokeren Oost-Vlaanderen players
FC Politehnica Iași (2010) players
Central African Republic expatriate footballers
Central African Republic expatriate sportspeople in Belgium
Central African Republic expatriate sportspeople in Romania
Central African Republic expatriate sportspeople in France
Expatriate footballers in Romania
Expatriate footballers in Belgium
Expatriate footballers in England
Expatriate footballers in France
Expatriate footballers in Turkey
Expatriate footballers in Qatar
Expatriate footballers in Israel
Championnat National 2 players
Championnat National 3 players